Playing God and Other Short Stories is the seventh studio album by Israeli death metal band Salem, released on April 3, 2010.

The album features At the Gates vocalist Tomas Lindberg singing lead vocals on "The Mark of the Beast Part 2" and co-lead vocals on "The Mark of the Beast Part 1".

The album features an unusual death metal cover to Bob Marley's classic song "Exodus".

Track listing

Note: The Israeli edition also contains a bonus track, an adaptation to a 12th-century Jewish hymn named "Et Sha'arei Ratzon" ("Time of the Gates of Grace") by rabbi Yehuda Ben Shmuel Abbas, which tells the story of the binding of Isaac.

Personnel
Ze'ev Tananboim - lead vocals
Lior Mizrachi - guitar
Nir Gutraiman - guitar
Michael Goldstein - bass
Nir Nakav - drums, percussion

Additional personnel
Tomas Lindberg - vocals on tracks 7 & 9
Kristin E. Wallace - female vocals on tracks 2 & 9

Production
Produced by Nir A, Ze'ev Tananboim & Nir Nakav
Mixed by Nir A, Ze'ev Tananboim & Nir Nakav
Mastered by UE Nastasi at Sterling Sound, New York City
Artwork & Design by Nir G

Release history

2010 albums
Salem (Israeli band) albums
Doom metal albums by Israeli artists